President Kuti is a 2021 Nigerian action film produced by Ibrahim Yekini. It was written by Azeezat Sorunmu and directed by Tope Adebayo and Ibrahim Yekini. President Kuti was released on 14 July 2021.

Cast 
Ibrahim Yekini
Bimpe Oyebade
Odunlade Adekola as Ayomide
Afeez Abiodun as Baba Afusa 
Adeyemi Adebisi as Manager
Light Aboluwodi as Customer
Omolara Adebayo as Lara
Poopola Adebimpe as Omo olona
Seilat Adebowale as Alagbo
Olaniyan Adenike as Receptionist
Aderoju Adeyemi as Alagbo
Janet Ajibawo as Olosho
Kola Ajeyemi as Alagbo
Adewale Ajose as Bureau de change
Yusuf Akintude as Alagbole
Kemi Apesin as Alagbo
Deola Ayoade as Alagbo
Mustapha Abiola as Mopol  Boyscout
Fathia Balogun as Kobewude

Synopsis 

President Kuti is the commander of the street who is respected yet feared by all; he faces attacks from rival gangs whom he has always won against.

Reception 

The action film generated  2 million views in the first two weeks after it was uploaded on YouTube.

Awards 
Best Indigenous Movie of the Year at City People Movie Awards.

See also 

 Odunlade Adekola
 Kesari (2018 film)
 Lucifer (Nollywood film)

References 

2021 films
Nigerian action films
Yoruba-language films
Nigerian adventure films